Brachinus testaceus is a species of ground beetle in the Brachininae subfamily that is endemic to Spain.

References

Beetles described in 1837
Endemic fauna of Spain
Beetles of Europe
Taxa named by Jules Pierre Rambur
Brachininae